The Rif Conflict may refer to:

First Melillan campaign (1893–94)
Second Melillan campaign (1909)
Kert campaign (1911–12)
Rif War (1921–26)
Rif Revolt (1958–59)
Rif Movement (2016–17)